Granigyra oblatogyra is a species of sea snail, a marine gastropod mollusk, unassigned in the superfamily Seguenzioidea.

Description
The shell grows to a height of 2.5 mm.

Distribution
This species occurs in the Atlantic Ocean off Brazil at depths between 500 m and 1250 m.

References

 De Souza P.J.S. jr. & Pimenta A.D. 2002. A new species of Granigyra Dall, 1889 (Gastropoda: Skeneidae) from Brazil and a review of known western Atlantic species. The Veliger 45(4): 299-302
 Bouchet, P.; Fontaine, B. (2009). List of new marine species described between 2002-2006. Census of Marine Life.

oblatogyra
Gastropods described in 2002